Valmaotsa is a village in Tartu Parish, Tartu County in eastern Estonia. Prior to the administrative reform of Estonian local governments in 2017, the village was located in Laeva Parish.

References

 

Villages in Tartu County